John Mills (December 29, 1787 – September 8, 1862) was a Massachusetts lawyer, and politician who served as Treasurer and Receiver-General of Massachusetts, as the President of the Massachusetts Senate, and as the U.S. Attorney for the District of Massachusetts.

Early life
Mills, the son of Drake Mills, was born in Sandisfield, Massachusetts on December 29, 1787.

Notes

1787 births
1861 deaths
Massachusetts state senators
Massachusetts lawyers
People from Sandisfield, Massachusetts
People from Springfield, Massachusetts
Presidents of the Massachusetts Senate
Members of the Massachusetts House of Representatives
State treasurers of Massachusetts
Massachusetts Free Soilers
United States Attorneys for the District of Massachusetts
19th-century American politicians
19th-century American lawyers